Rodovia Brigadeiro Faria Lima (official designation SP-326) is a highway in the state of São Paulo, Brazil.

SP-326 is a full four-lane highway connecting the cities of Bebedouro and Barretos, serving also the city of Colina, and runs in the Southeast to Northeast direction. It is managed and maintained through a state concession to the private company Tebe and therefore is a toll road. The highway is named in honor of a former Air Force brigadier and celebrated mayor of the city of São Paulo from 1965 to 1969, José Vicente de Faria Lima.

See also
 Highway system of São Paulo

Highways in São Paulo (state)